Romania participated in the Eurovision Song Contest 2018 with the song "Goodbye" written by Alexandru Matei, Alin Neagoe and Cristina Caramarcu. The song was performed by the Humans. The Romanian broadcaster Televiziunea Română (TVR) organised the national final Selecția Națională 2018 in order to select the Romanian entry for the 2018 contest in Lisbon, Portugal. The national final consisted of six shows: five semi-finals and a final. A total of sixty entries were selected and twelve competed in each semi-final where a five-member jury panel selected three entries to advance to the final. The fifteen qualifiers competed in the final on 25 February 2018 where "Goodbye" performed by The Humans was selected as the winner entirely by a public vote.

Romania was drawn to compete in the second semi-final of the Eurovision Song Contest which took place on 10 May 2018. Performing during the show in position 2, "Goodbye" was not announced among the top 10 entries of the second semi-final and therefore did not qualify to compete in the final. This marked the first time that Romania failed to qualify to the final of the Eurovision Song Contest from a semi-final since the introduction of semi-finals in 2004. It was later revealed that Romania placed eleventh out of the 18 participating countries in the semi-final with 107 points.

Background 

Prior to the 2018 contest, Romania had participated in the Eurovision Song Contest 18 times since its first entry in 1994. To this point, its highest placing in the contest has been third place, which the nation achieved on two occasions: in 2005 with the song "Let Me Try" performed by Luminița Anghel and Sistem, and in 2010 with the song "Playing with Fire" performed by Paula Seling and Ovi. To this point, Romania has qualified to the final on every occasion since the introduction of semi-finals to the format of the contest in 2004. After returning to the contest in 2017 following their forced one-year absence in 2016 due to repeated non-payment of debts to the EBU, "Yodel It!" by Ilinca featuring Alex Florea placed 7th in the final.

The Romanian national broadcaster, Televiziunea Română (TVR), broadcasts the event within Romania and organizes the selection process for the nation's entry. TVR has consistently selected the Romanian Eurovision entry through national finals that feature a competition among several artists and songs. The broadcaster confirmed their intentions to participate at the 2018 Eurovision Song Contest on 7 July 2017. TVR had set up national finals with several artists to choose both the song and performer to compete at Eurovision for Romania, a procedure which the broadcaster opted for once again to select their 2018 entry.

Before Eurovision

Selecția Națională 2018 

Selecția Națională 2018 was the national final organised by TVR in order to select Romania's entry for the Eurovision Song Contest 2018. The competition consisted of six shows: five semi-finals featuring twelve songs each and a final featuring fifteen songs to be held between 21 January and 25 February 2018. Under the slogan Eurovision unește România! (Eurovision unites Romania!), the shows took place in different cities across Romania in celebration of the 100th anniversary of the Union of Transylvania with Romania (also known locally as the "Great Union") and were hosted by Diana Dumitrescu and Cezar Ouatu who represented Romania in the Eurovision Song Contest 2013. The six shows were televised on TVR1, TVR HD, TVRi as well as online via the broadcaster's streaming service TVR+ and YouTube. The six shows were also broadcast in Moldova via the channel TVR Moldova. TVR hosted behind-the-scenes programmes the day prior to each show which contained interviews and pre-recorded inserts such as rehearsal, press conference footage and other backstage material.

Competing entries 

TVR opened a submission period for artists and composers to submit their entries between 15 November 2017 and 15 December 2017. The broadcaster received 72 submissions after the submission deadline passed, of which 68 participated in auditions held between 19 and 20 December 2017 at the TVR Studio 2 in Bucharest. The auditions were later broadcast on TVR1 and TVR HD between 12 and 15 January 2018. A jury panel consisting of Marian Ionescu, Liliana Ștefa, Nicu Patoi, Ilinca Băcilă and Viorel Gavrilă reviewed the performances during the auditions and rated each song between 1 (lowest) and 10 (highest) based on criteria such as the melodic harmony and structure of the song, the orchestral arrangement, originality and stylistic diversity of the composition and sound and voice quality. After the combination of the jury votes, the top sixty entries that scored the highest, one per artist that entered with more than one song, were selected for the national final. The competing entries were announced on 22 December 2017. Among the competing artists was Mihai, who previously represented Romania in the Eurovision Song Contest in 2006, and Alex Florea, who previously represented Romania in the Eurovision Song Contest in 2017. On 9 January 2018, "Fix Me" performed by Freia was disqualified from the competition due to the song having been released in China prior to 1 September 2017. The entry was replaced with the song "Baby You're the Only One" performed by Tomer Cohen.

Semi-finals 
Five semi-finals took place in January and February 2018. The five shows were held in different theatres and cities across Romania, with regional presenters hosting segments from the green room in each show. These were: TVR Iași presenter Anca Medeleanu in semi-final 1; TVR Timișoara presenter Doriana Talpeș in semi-final 2; TVR Craiova presenter Alina Șerban in semi-final 3; TVR Cluj presenter Loredana Corchiș in semi-final 4; and TVR Tîrgu-Mureș presenter Simona Boantă in semi-final 5. In each show twelve songs were selected to compete and a jury panel consisting of Marian Ionescu (bass guitarist, pianist, composer), Liliana Ștefan (lyricist), Nicu Patoi (guitarist), Ilinca Băcilă (singer, represented Romania in the Eurovision Song Contest 2017) and Viorel Gavrilă (composer, conductor) selected three songs to qualify to the final.

In addition to the competing entries, other performances featured during the shows. In semi-final 1 the opening act featured 2005 Romanian Eurovision entrant Luminița Anghel performing the song "Hora din Moldova" with the Țara Vrancei Folk Ensemble, and the interval act featured performances by the band Pasărea Rock; in semi-final 2 the opening act featured Ricardo Caria performing the song "Amar pelos dois" and the interval act featured performances by Cargo, Lavinia Răducanu and Neda Ukraden; in semi-final 3 the interval act featured performances by BiBi, FreeStay, Dan Helciug and Mihaela Alexa; in semi-final 4 the interval act featured performances by 2009 Romanian Eurovision entrant Elena Gheorghe, Ad Libitum and Katia Cărbune; and in semi-final 5 the interval act featured a pre-recorded performance by Direcția 5, filmed at the Piața Cetății in Sighișoara on 17 February. Several cities contributed financially towards organising the event: the city of Timișoara contributed €43,000 for semi-final 2; the city of Craiova contributed €40,795 for semi-final 3; and the city of Turda contributed approximately €30,000 for semi-final 4.

Final 
The final took place on 25 February 2018 at the Sala Polivalentă in Bucharest. Ioana Voicu and Sonia Argint-Ionescu hosted segments from the green room. Fifteen songs competed and the winner, "Goodbye" performed by the Humans, was selected exclusively by public televoting. In addition to the performances of the competing entries, the interval acts featured performances by 2017 Romanian Eurovision entrant Ilinca Băcilă, 2018 Moldovan Eurovision entrants DoReDoS performing their Eurovision song "My Lucky Day", as well as performances by the Alex Calancea Band.

Promotion 
Prior to the contest, the Humans specifically promoted "Goodbye" as the Romanian Eurovision entry on 10 March 2018 by performing at the Romanian stand of the ITB Berlin event, which was held at the Internationales Congress Centrum Berlin in Germany.

At Eurovision 
According to Eurovision rules, all nations with the exceptions of the host country and the "Big Five" (France, Germany, Italy, Spain and the United Kingdom) are required to qualify from one of two semi-finals in order to compete for the final; the top ten countries from each semi-final progress to the final. The European Broadcasting Union (EBU) split up the competing countries into six different pots based on voting patterns from previous contests, with countries with favourable voting histories put into the same pot. On 29 January 2018, a special allocation draw was held which placed each country into one of the two semi-finals, as well as which half of the show they would perform in. Romania was placed into the second semi-final, to be held on 10 May 2018, and was scheduled to perform in the first half of the show.

Once all the competing songs for the 2018 contest had been released, the running order for the semi-finals was decided by the shows' producers rather than through another draw, so that similar songs were not placed next to each other. Romania was set to perform in position 2, following the entry from Norway and before the entry from Serbia.

All three shows were broadcast in Romania on TVR1, TVRi and TVR HD with commentary by Liliana Ștefan and Radu Andrei Tudor. The Romanian spokesperson, who announced the top 12-point score awarded by the Romanian jury during the final, was Sonia Argint-Ionescu.

Semi-final

The Humans took part in technical rehearsals on 1 and 4 May, followed by dress rehearsals on 9 and 10 May. This included the jury show on 9 May where the professional juries of each country watched and voted on the competing entries.

The stage show featured the members of the Humans (one of the lead singers of the band, Adrian Tănase, was replaced by cellist Corina Matei for the performance) performing in a band set-up with 25 black and white mannequins wearing white masks on their faces placed around the stage floor. The lead singer of the band Cristina Caramarcu was dressed in a purple frock while the remaining members were dressed in white outfits, of which the two guitarists wore white masks on the backs of their heads. In regards to the mannequins, the Humans stated: "All the mannequins represent humanity, the people. They don't have a face, you don't see a race, nothing. We're all humans, we are equal."

At the end of the show, Romania was not announced among the top 10 entries in the second semi-final and therefore failed to qualify to compete in the final. This marked the first time that Romania failed to qualify to the final of the Eurovision Song Contest from a semi-final since the introduction of semi-finals in 2004. It was later revealed that Romania placed eleventh in the semi-final, receiving a total of 107 points: 40 points from the televoting and 67 points from the juries.

Voting
Voting during the three shows involved each country awarding two sets of points from 1-8, 10 and 12: one from their professional jury and the other from televoting. Each nation's jury consisted of five music industry professionals who are citizens of the country they represent, with their names published before the contest to ensure transparency. This jury judged each entry based on: vocal capacity; the stage performance; the song's composition and originality; and the overall impression by the act. In addition, no member of a national jury was permitted to be related in any way to any of the competing acts in such a way that they cannot vote impartially and independently. The individual rankings of each jury member as well as the nation's televoting results were released shortly after the grand final.

Below is a breakdown of points awarded to Romania and awarded by Romania in the second semi-final and grand final of the contest, and the breakdown of the jury voting and televoting conducted during the two shows:

Points awarded to Romania

Points awarded by Romania

Detailed voting results
The following members comprised the Romanian jury:
 Mihai Mircea Alexandru (Al Mike; jury chairperson)composer, music producer
 Nicu Patoimusician
 Anca Lupeșmusic business consultant
 Sanda Cepragasound director
 Gabi Cotabițămusician

References

External links 
 Official TVR Eurovision site

2018
Countries in the Eurovision Song Contest 2018
Eurovision
Eurovision